Events in the year 1887 in Costa Rica.

Incumbents
President: Bernardo Soto Alfaro

Events

Births
September 13 - Rodriguez Garcia-Uriza

Deaths
June 15 - Miguel Mora Porras
September 26 - José María Montealegre
October 17 - Rafael García-Escalante Nava

 
Years of the 19th century in Costa Rica